Jean-Paul Ribreau (born December 1, 1957) is a former professional footballer who played as a defender.

See also
Football in France
List of football clubs in France

References

External links
Jean-Paul Ribreau profile at chamoisfc79.fr

1957 births
Living people
French footballers
Association football defenders
Chamois Niortais F.C. players
Ligue 1 players
Ligue 2 players